The Manukau Magpies are a rugby league football club based in Mangere, a suburb of Auckland in New Zealand, who compete in the Auckland Rugby League. The club was established in March 1912 after a meeting in Onehunga (where they were originally based). That year they fielded a senior team and two junior teams.

History
Established in 1912, the club played as the Manukau Rovers with Jim Rukutai as club captain. The club was officially affiliated with the Auckland Rugby League at their annual meeting on 16 April.

Their first committee selected at that first meeting in March 1912 was Patron: Mr. F.W. Lang, (M.P.); President: Mr. John R. Sceates; Secretary: Mr. H.V. Pattin; Treasurer: Mr. H.E. Reynolds; Committee: Messrs R.W. Sansbury, T.A. George, J.B. Morton, T. Grundy, H.E. Reynolds, A. Patten, E. Pullan, Jim Rukutai, and S. Child (chairman).

In their first season they had 53 registered members. Their senior team squad was made up of the following players: Jim Rukutai, Arthur Hardgrave, Pullen, Strong, Alexander, Targuse, Hughes, Griffiths, McGechan, Clark (2), Kennedy, Tole, Wilson, and Moore (2). They finished the 1912 season with 3 wins and 7 losses. In the 1913 season they struggled to put a full team on the field and pulled out of the senior grade after playing just 5 matches. In 1914 they fielded junior teams only and this continued until 1923 when they amalgamated with the Mangere club to enter a senior team in the competition named "Mangere United".

In 1924 the entire club switched codes and became a rugby union club. They were extremely critical of the Auckland Rugby League and stated that they had been on the end of a number of poor decisions over the previous three seasons particularly to do with player registrations. The details of which were laid out in a letter from the club secretary which was published in the Auckland Star on 12 July 1924. Auckland Rugby League responded stating that the details in the letter were not correct.

The Manukau Rugby League club was reborn at a meeting in Onehunga on 29 September 1932 with Jim Rukutai in attendance
.

The club was initially mainly active in junior grades until 1936 when a senior team was re-established after Steve Watene, a Kiwi international convinced Auckland Rugby League that the team he had built from scratch would be competitive. Watene had travelled through many parts of the North Island recruiting players, including Jack Hemi, Joe Boughton, and Len Kawe (who had represented New Zealand Maori in 1925), Tom Trevarthan from Otago rugby. History was made that year when they took out the Championship (Fox Memorial), and Roope Rooster knockout competition in their first season back in the top grade since the 1913 season. Watene became the first ever Māori player to captain the Kiwi's .

The club celebrated its centenary in 2011. Dean Bell was named as the Manukau Player of the Century. Given the club moved to the rugby union code in 1924 and wasn't re-established as a league club until 1932 the 2020 season would mark the 100th year of the club playing rugby league.

Notable players
Players who have played for Manukau include George Nēpia and Puti Tipene (Steve) Watene. Arthur Hardgrave was Manukau's first New Zealand representative, playing for New Zealand in Manukau's foundation year (1912). His son Roy Hardgrave later also represented New Zealand in 1928 and spent time playing for St Helen's in England.

The club later had a close association with the Bell family as Dean Bell, Ian Bell and Clayton Friend all played for the club and Cameron Bell coached the club.

The following players have played for Manukau and gone on the make the New Zealand national rugby league team with the year(s):

 Arthur Hardgrave 1912
 Jack Hemi 1936
 Puti Tipene (Steve) Watene 1936
 Frank Pickrang 1936
 Tommy Trevarthan 1936
 George Nēpia 1937 
 Walter Pierrepont Brimble 1938
 Wilfred Pierrepont Brimble 1938
 John Purewa (Jack) Brodrick 1938-39
 Rangi Chase 1937–38
 Tom Chase 1939
 Pita Ririnui 1939
 Lummy Graham 1970
 Doug Gailey 1974
 Ian Bell 1978–83
 Clayton Friend 1982–91
 Dean Bell 1983–89
 Nick Wright 1983  
 Kelly Shelford 1989–91

Manukau Senior Team Records (1912-1924 & 1933-1944 +2022)
The season record for the most senior men’s team in the club.

Club titles (1912-1944)
 1919 Third Grade
 1920 Third Grade and Fifth Grade
 1922 Second Grade knockout competition
 1936 First Grade (Fox Memorial)
 1941 Thistle Cup (highest point scorers in the 2nd round)
 1942 First Grade (Fox Memorial)
 1943 First Grade (Fox Memorial)

Manukau Magpies top point scorers and try scorers (1912-1944)
The point scoring lists are compiled from matches played in the first grade championship, Roope Rooster, Phelan Shield and Stormont Shield matches which involved all first grade sides. It does not include additional one off type matches such as those against non-Auckland teams or charity matches.

References

 
Rugby clubs established in 1910
Auckland rugby league clubs
Manukau Magpies players